The Fugitive is an American action thriller television series developed by Nick Santora for Quibi. It is an update on the 1963 television series and the 1993 film, both of the same name, but with new characters. The series is directed by Stephen Hopkins.

The series premiered on August 3, 2020. Episodes are 6 to 9 minutes long.

Premise
When a bomb rips through the Los Angeles subway train he is riding on, blue-collar Mike Ferro just wants to make sure his wife, Allison, and 10-year-old daughter, Pearl, are safe. But the faulty evidence on the ground and a “tweet-now, confirm-later” journalist paint a nightmarish picture: it looks to all the world that Mike was responsible for the heinous act. Wrongfully—and very publicly—accused, Mike must prove his innocence by uncovering the real perpetrator, before the legendary cop heading the investigation can apprehend him.

Cast
 Boyd Holbrook as Mike Ferro
 Natalie Martinez as Allison Ferro
 Tiya Sircar as Pritti Patel
 Brian Geraghty as Colin Murphy
 Genesis Rodriguez as Detective Sloan Womack
 Shareeka Epps as Ronnie Lawson
 Daniel David Stewart as Stamell
 Kiefer Sutherland as Detective Clay Bryce
 Glenn Howerton as Jerry

Episodes

Production

Development
The series was announced in July 2019, to be a part of the upcoming Quibi streaming service. In September, Stephen Hopkins was brought on to direct with filming beginning in October.

In September 2019, Boyd Holbrook and Kiefer Sutherland were cast to star in the series. In November, Tiya Sircar was added to the cast. In December 2019, it was announced that several new cast members would be joining the lineup Natalie Martinez, Brian Geraghty, Genesis Rodriguez and Keilani Arellanes.

Release
On February 1, 2020, the first teaser trailer was released.

See also
 The Fugitive (2000 TV series)

References

External links
 
 

2020 American television series debuts
2020 American television series endings
2020s American crime drama television series
2020s American mystery television series
American action television series
American thriller television series
Action web series
Crime drama web series
Quibi original programming
Television series by 3 Arts Entertainment
Television series by Warner Bros. Television Studios
Television series reboots
Thriller web series
Wrongful convictions in fiction
Television series by Thunder Road Films
Television shows set in Los Angeles